The Mato District is one of 10 districts of the Huaylas Province in the Ancash Region of Peru. The capital of the district is the village of Villa Sucre.

History
The district was founded on January 2, 1857.

Location
The district is located in the west-central part of the province at an elevation of 2,239m in the black mountains, neighboring district is the Caraz district in which the provinces capital Caraz is located, 12 km from the village of Villa Sucre. The regions capital Huaraz is located at 79 km from Villa Sucre.

Political division
The district is divided into 1 village, 4 hamlets and 19:

Villages
Villa Sucre

Hamlets
Ancoracá
Huacanhuasi
Huáncup
Huinó

Anexos
Atún Corral
Carmen
Cata
Cochamarca
Cruz Viva
Huacapununan
Huashuash
Huarinya
Hueto
Huishca
Malambo
Manzana
Muchup
Ocona pampa alto y bajo
Poma chuco alto y bajo
Puca
Quinquín
San Diego
Teja Huai

Capital
The capital of the Mato district is the village of Villa Sucre.

See also 
 Puka Punta

References

External links
  Official web site of the Mato district

Districts of the Huaylas Province
Districts of the Ancash Region